Bijan Kumar Mukherjea (15 August 1891 – 22 February 1956) was the 4th Chief Justice of India. He was in his office from 22 December 1954 to 31 January 1956.

Avocation 
Joined Calcutta Bar in 1914
Junior Govt. Pleader Calcutta High Court, 1934
Senior Govt. Pleader, Calcutta Court, 1936
Judge Calcutta High Court, November 1936 – 1948
Member Bengal Boundary Commission, 1947
Judge, Federal Court/Supreme Court 14 Oct. 1948-22 Dec.1954.
Chief Justice of India 1954-31 Jan 1956

On Patanjali Sastri's retirement in January 1954, Nehru had asked B.K. Mukherjea to take over as Chief Justice. However Mukherjea had declined, saying that Mehr Chand Mahajan was senior to him. When Nehru pressed him, the judge said he would sooner resign than usurp the highest office before his turn. Only after Mahajan retired did Mukherjea become CJI.

Education and academics
After completion of his education in Hooghly Branch Government School, and Hooghly Mohasin College, Hooghly, West Bengal, he joined the Surendranath Law College under the University of Calcutta.

He was an M.A. (history), B.L. (gold medalist), M.L. (gold medalist), doctor of Law.

He was an Anauth Dev Research Prizeman, Tagore Law Lecturer (Calcutta University), and also a Saraswati (Sanskrit).

Personal life
Mukherjea was born to Rakhal Das Mukherjee  and Sarat Kumari Devi. Rakhal Das had graduated from Duff College, Calcutta, to become a Vakil. Bijan grew up in his maternal home ("Rose Villa", Hooghly).  He had a sister and a brilliant younger brother, Bipin (who died at the tender age of ten). 

Married Labanyalata Devi and had a son Amiya Kumar Mookerji (who followed his father's vocation to become a judge of the Calcutta High Court), a granddaughter, Meera Ganguli (nee Mookerji), and a great grandson Anjan Ganguli.  

Mukherjea had his ancestral house in Nabadwip, Dist. Nadia, West Bengal, and was a descendant of Krittibas Ojha (translator and adapter of the Bengali version of Valmiki's Ramayana).  

Mukherjea was a disciple of Sri Sri Balananada Brahmachari of Deogharh, Jharkhand.

Memberships and association
Fellow of the Calcutta University
President of the Bengal Sanskrit Association

Associated with Scouts Movement in Bengal

Acted as District Commissioner, South Calcutta Boys Sc Association

Connected with Literary and Cultural Society Bibudha Janani Sava, Nabadwip, Gita Sava, Calcutta, St. Sahitya Parishad; Calcutta etc.

Publication
 Problems & Law
 Hindu Law of Religious and Charitable Trusts

References

External links
Biography at Supreme Court of India website
More extensive bio at www.indiankanoon.org (in the appendix to his memory on the bottom of the page)

2. https://www.lawyersupdate.co.in/book-reviews-releases/a-judge-nonpareil-a-b-k-mukherjea-reader-v-sudhish-pai/

1891 births
1956 deaths
20th-century Indian judges
Judges of the Calcutta High Court
Chief justices of India
University of Calcutta alumni
Surendranath Law College alumni
Academic staff of the University of Calcutta
20th-century Indian lawyers